Gregory Glacier is a glacier flowing into Cierva Cove north of Breguet Glacier, on the west coast of Graham Land, Antarctica. It was shown on an Argentine government chart of 1957. The glacier was named by the UK Antarctic Place-Names Committee in 1960 for Hollingsworth Franklin Gregory, an American pioneer in the development and use of helicopters.

Further reading 
 M. G. Laird, G. D. Mansergh & J. M. A. Chappell (1971), Geology of the Central Nimrod Glacier area, Antarctica, PP 436 – 437, New Zealand Journal of Geology and  Geophysics, 14:3, 427–468, DOI: 10.1080/00288306.1971.10421939

External links 
 Gregory Glacier Copernix satellite image

References

Glaciers of Davis Coast